Randy Boehning (born September 17, 1962) is an American politician. He was a member of the North Dakota House of Representatives from the 27th District, serving from 2002 to 2018. He is a member of the Republican Party. He received a BA from Moorhead State University, University of Wisconsin, Madison, 1994 and an AAS, Business Administration, North Dakota State College of Science, 1988–1990.

After voting against expanding gay rights in North Dakota Senate Bill 2279, Boehning was outed for sending an explicit photo and messages to another man on Grindr in April 2015; he initially claimed it was political retaliation for his vote.  On April 30, 2015, Boehning was quoted by the Grand Forks Herald as saying he is "gay" and that he is "relieved to come out", and also said he is attracted to women.

References

External links
Representative Randy Boehning

Republican Party members of the North Dakota House of Representatives
LGBT state legislators in North Dakota
American builders
1962 births
Living people
Bisexual men
Bisexual politicians
People from Richland County, North Dakota
Minnesota State University Moorhead alumni
University of Wisconsin–Madison alumni
North Dakota State College of Science alumni
21st-century American politicians
LGBT conservatism in the United States